Frank Monroe "Bud" Taylor Jr. DDS (June 16, 1916 – March 30, 1991) was an American amateur golfer. He played in the 1957, 1959 and 1961 Walker Cup matches.

Golf career
Taylor represented the United States in the Walker Cup in 1957, 1959, and 1961, in the 1958 Eisenhower Trophy and also in the Americas Cup in 1958 and 1960. He won the California State Amateur Championship in successive years, 1954 and 1955. He played in the Masters five times, twice finishing in the top 20. He also played in the U.S. Open three times. In 1956 he was in the top 10 after two rounds but faded and finished tied for 29th place. Taylor reached the final of the U.S. Amateur in 1957, losing 5 & 4 to Hillman Robbins.

Personal life
Taylor trained as a dentist at the University of Southern California and served in the U.S. Army during World War II. After the war he practiced dentistry in Pomona, California and later in Palm Springs until retiring in 1985. In 1990 he moved with his second wife Jane to Victor, Montana. Both he and his wife were suffering from ill-health and on March 30, 1991 they committed suicide. A hose was connected from a car exhaust into the interior of the car and the couple died of carbon monoxide poisoning.

Amateur wins
1954 California State Amateur Championship
1955 California State Amateur Championship

Results in major championships

Note: Taylor never played in The Open Championship or the PGA Championship.

CUT = missed the half-way cut
"T" indicates a tie for a place

U.S. national team appearances
Walker Cup: 1957 (winners), 1959 (winners), 1961 (winners)
Americas Cup: 1958 (winners), 1960 (winners)
Eisenhower Trophy: 1958

References

American male golfers
Amateur golfers
Golfers from California
People from Ontario, California
People from Victor, Montana
1916 births
1991 deaths